Cyana catorhoda is a moth of the family Erebidae. It was described by George Hampson in 1897. It is found in Assam in India and in Myanmar.

References

Cyana
Moths described in 1897